The 2006–07 season was the 83rd season in the existence of AEK Athens F.C. and the 48th consecutive season in the top flight of Greek football. They competed in the Super League, the Greek Cup, the UEFA Champions League and the UEFA Cup. The season began on 9 August 2006 and finished on 13 May 2007.

Overview
For the third season in a row, Demis Nikolaidis, who decided at the end of the previous season that it was time to part ways with the team with Fernando Santos, despite the good presence of the Portuguese technician on the team's bench. The reason was that the president of AEK was looking for a coach who played more offensive style and gave a lot of weight to young players and the team's academies. Nikolaidis ended up with the acclaimed Spanish coach Lorenzo Serra Ferrer, who, among other things, has served in the academies and in the first team of the great Barcelona. One of the team's key leaders, Kostas Katsouranis, left AEK, following Santos to Benfica. On the other hand, Akis Zikos returned after a four-year absence in Monaco.

AEK started the season relatively "numb", but then recovered and especially from the 7th matchday onwards when they makes 7 consecutive victories. Another streak of 6 wins later in the 2nd round, but those were not enough to achieve more than the eventual second place finish. They finished 8 points above Panathinaikos, but another 9 below the champion Olympiacos. For another season, however, there were complaints from many teams in the league about the treatment of the red and whites by the referees.

In the Greek Cup, AEK was a surprise victim, eliminated in the first round by the team of Chaidari in a single match, after the 0-0 in regular time, a score that did not change even in extra time, despite the expulsion of 2 players of Chaidari, while in the penalty shootout Chaidari won by 5–4.

AEK's chance for its fourth participation in the groups of the Champions League passed through the matches with the Scottish Hearts, an opponent that was not easy, but certainly not intimidating either. First match at Murrayfield Stadium, Serra Ferrer showed a super attacking AEK, who missed many chances in the first half. In the replay, Serra Ferrer's team slowed down and Hearts made it 1–0. Finally, the Greek team found the way to the net at the end of the game and in the overtime they made their big comeback. The final score was 1–2 and qualification was very close for the yellow-blacks. In the second leg in Athens in front of over 45,000 people, AEK's superiority was clear again from the start of the match had the full control, missed some chances, but failed to score. With 3 goals towards the end of the game, AEK finally got a very nice qualification with two wins. AEK competed again in Champions League groups after 3 years and were drawn in the 8th group with the eventual winner of the institution, Milan, Lille and Anderlecht. There, AEK with a total of 2 wins, including a home win against the great Milan, 2 draws and 2 losses they finished 3rd and were out of the competition, continuing in the UEFA Cup.

AEK were drawn with Paris Saint-Germain for the round of 32 and their task was certainly not easy at all. First match on February 14 at Olympic Stadium in front of around 30,000 spectators, Ferrer in a rather incomprehensible decision, decided to rest some players. However, Paul Le Guen was doing something similar by leaving some of his key players on the bench. At the end of the first half, Paris opened the score, while in the replay, AEK again conceded a goal at the end of the game. The qualification was already essentially over for AEK, while it was noteworthy that during the match Demis Nikolaidis was strongly disapproved of by a large part of the world for the relaxed attitude shown by AEK in the match. The rematch at the Parc des Princes was more formal than essential and Le Guen decided to start with a line-up with several reserves, while Ferrer on the other hand made a mix-up in the line-up. The French once again scored at the end of each half and won with the same score and the European campaign of the yellow-blacks ended there.

The greatest wins of the season were the 5–0 against AEL, the 4–0 against Panionios and an by 1–2 over Panathinaikos, away from home. The top scorer of the team and of the league was Nikos Liberopoulos with 18 goals. Also 9 goals were scored by Júlio César and 8 goals by Leonidas Kampantais.

Players

Squad information

NOTE: The players are the ones that have been announced by the AEK Athens' press release. No edits should be made unless a player arrival or exit is announced. Updated 30 June 2007, 23:59 UTC+3.

Transfers

In

Summer

Winter

Out

Summer

Notes

 a.  plus 25% of resale fee and the incomes from their scheduled friendly game which came to be €294,390.

Winter

Loan in

Summer

Loan out

Summer

Winter

Renewals

Overall transfer activity

Expenditure
Summer:  €1,500,000

Winter:  €0

Total:  €1,500,000

Income
Summer:  €2,300,000

Winter:  €0

Total:  €2,300,000

Net Totals
Summer:  €800,000

Winter:  €0

Total:  €800,000

Manager stats

Only competitive matches are counted. Wins, losses and draws are results at the final whistle; the results of penalty shootouts are not counted.

Pre-season and friendlies

Super League Greece

League table

Results summary

Results by Matchday

Fixtures

Greek Cup

UEFA Champions League

Third qualifying round

Group stage

UEFA Cup

Round of 32

UEFA rankings

Statistics

Squad statistics

! colspan="13" style="background:#FFDE00; text-align:center" | Goalkeepers
|-

! colspan="13" style="background:#FFDE00; color:black; text-align:center;"| Defenders
|-

! colspan="13" style="background:#FFDE00; color:black; text-align:center;"| Midfielders
|-

! colspan="13" style="background:#FFDE00; color:black; text-align:center;"| Forwards
|-

! colspan="13" style="background:#FFDE00; color:black; text-align:center;"| Left during Winter Transfer Window
|-

|-
|}

Disciplinary record

|-
! colspan="20" style="background:#FFDE00; text-align:center" | Goalkeepers

|-
! colspan="20" style="background:#FFDE00; color:black; text-align:center;"| Defenders

|-
! colspan="20" style="background:#FFDE00; color:black; text-align:center;"| Midfielders

|-
! colspan="20" style="background:#FFDE00; color:black; text-align:center;"| Forwards

|-
! colspan="20" style="background:#FFDE00; color:black; text-align:center;"| Left during Winter Transfer window

|-
|}

Starting 11

References

External links
AEK Athens F.C. Official Website

Greek football clubs 2006–07 season
2006-07